Alcorn State University (Alcorn State, ASU or Alcorn) is a public historically black land-grant university adjacent to Lorman, Mississippi. It was founded in 1871 and was the first black land grant college established in the United States.

One of Alcorn's most notable graduates, Medgar Evers, a civil rights activist, graduated in 1952. Students and alumni of the college were part of the mid-twentieth century Civil Rights Movement, working to register voters and end inequality in the U.S. The university is a member-school of the Thurgood Marshall College Fund.

Alcorn State's athletic teams known as the Braves and compete in the NCAA's Division I. All teams compete as members of the Southwestern Athletic Conference (SWAC).

History
Alcorn State University was the first black land grant college in the country. Mississippi's Reconstructionist legislature, dominated by Republicans sympathetic to the cause of educating the formerly enslaved, was established on the site of Oakland College, a college that had gone defunct due to the Civil War. Alcorn University started with what is recognized as three historic buildings.

United States Senator Hiram R. Revels resigned his seat when he accepted the position as Alcorn's first president. The state legislature provided $50,000 in cash for ten successive years for the establishment and overall operations of the college. The land was sold for $188,928 with Alcorn receiving a share of $113,400. This money was to be used solely to support the agricultural and mechanical components of the college, which Congress wanted to develop nationally. From its beginning, Alcorn State University was a land-grant college. After a group of white Democrats known as Redeemers took over the legislature, Alcorn's appropriation was slashed by almost 90 percent, to $5,500 per year, and an all-white board of trustees was appointed.

In 1878, the name Alcorn University was changed to Alcorn Agricultural and Mechanical College. The university's original  of land have been expanded to develop a  campus. The goals for the college set by the Mississippi legislature following the Reconstruction era emphasized training for blacks rather than academic education. The school, like other black schools during these years, was less a college than a vocational school intended to prepare students for the agricultural economy of the state and of most of their hometowns.

At first the school was exclusively for black males, but women were admitted in 1895. Today, women outnumber men at the university 1800 to 1200. Alcorn began with eight faculty members in 1871. Today the faculty and staff number more than 500. The student body has grown from 179 mostly local male students to more than 4,000 students from all over the world.

In 1974, Alcorn Agricultural and Mechanical College was renamed Alcorn State University, representing the development of its programs. Governor William L. Waller signed House Bill 298 granting university status to Alcorn and the other state-supported colleges. Alcorn had already become a more diversified university, with graduate programs. It provides an undergraduate education that enables students to continue their work in graduate and professional schools, engage in teaching, and enter other professions. It also provides graduate education to equip students for further training in specialized fields.

In 1994 Jay Searcy of the Philadelphia Inquirer said that except for its football team, Evers, and "an occasional Olympic athlete," "Alcorn rarely gets mentioned outside the state of Mississippi" although attention on the university increased after Steve McNair made athletic successes.

In 2020, MacKenzie Scott donated $25 million to Alcorn State. Her donation is the largest single gift in Alcorn State's history.

Alcorn State is accredited, with seven schools and degree programs in more than 50 areas, including a nursing and a Master of Business Administration program. The facilities number approximately 80 modern structures with an approximate value of $71 million.

Presidents

Academics
Alcorn State is the second largest historically black college or university (HBCU) and the fifth largest university in Mississippi with an enrollment of approximately 3,700 undergraduate students and 600 graduate students.
The university has seven schools, offering more than 50 different fields of study.
School of Agriculture and Applied Sciences
School of Arts and Sciences
School of Business
School of Education and Psychology
School of Nursing

Alcorn State University consistently ranks among the top 25 HBCUs in the nation according to the annual U.S. News & World Report HBCU rankings.

Alcorn State University is the only HBCU in Mississippi with a comprehensive nursing program.

The Myrlie Evers-Williams Honors Program is available to highly motivated undergraduate students seeking to enhance their academic experience and leadership skills.

Master of Business Administration (MBA) program
Alcorn State University offers a Master of Business Administration (MBA) program through its Natchez campus. Classes are conducted in the evening. Students may join the live lecture classes via a live internet feed. The program is accredited by the Accreditation Council for Business Schools and Programs (ACBSP), a global accrediting body for business degree programs. The MBA program has been popular with international and out-of-state students.

Global programs
Besides coordinating study-abroad opportunities, Global Programs brings worldwide perspectives to campus through exchange programs and special events.

Pre-professional programs
Alcorn offers pre-professional programs to better prepare students for a transition to specialized studies in the fields of law, engineering, nursing, physical therapy, medicine, pharmacy and dentistry.

Accreditation
Alcorn State University is accredited by the Commission on Colleges of the Southern Association of Colleges and Schools to award the Associate, Bachelor's, Master's, and Specialist in Education degrees.

Alcorn's teacher education program is accredited by the National Council for the Accreditation of Teacher Education. The Bachelor of Science in Nutrition and Dietetics is accredited by the American Dietetics Association. The Associate of Science in Nursing degree, the Bachelor of Science in Nursing degree, and the Master of Science in Nursing degree programs are accredited by the National League for Nursing Accrediting Commission. Alcorn State University is an accredited institutional member of the National Association of Schools of Music, the National Association of Industrial Technology, and the American Association of Family and Consumer Sciences.

Locations

The main campus is located in Alcorn State University census-designated place, an unincorporated area in Claiborne County, Mississippi. It is near Lorman.

The Nursing School and the Business School's Master of Business Administration (MBA) program are located in Natchez, Mississippi. The university also has a class center in Vicksburg.

Campus housing
Male residence halls include Medgar Wiley Evers Heritage Village Complex A and B, Hiram Revels Hall and Albert Lott Hall. Female residence halls include Medgar Wiley Evers Heritage Village Complex buildings C and D, John Burrus Hall, Beulah Robinson Hall, and the Female Honors Residence Hall.
D
Faculty housing, which is open to full time employees, and their dependents, is zoned to the Claiborne County School District. Port Gibson High School is the comprehensive high school of the district.

Athletics

Alcorn State is a member of the Southwestern Athletic Conference (SWAC) and participates in NCAA Division I FCS.  Alcorn sponsors 15 athletic programs.

Sounds of Dyn-O-mite
Alcorn State University's marching band was founded in the 1960s; the band is known as the "Sounds of Dyn-O-mite" (SOD). Led by four or five drum majors, SOD has more than 190+ members.

The "Golden Girls" (GGs) is the danceline that has been featured with SOD since its inception. Founded in 1968, the GGs is the oldest danceline (no twirling batons) featured with a HBCU marching band which is why they often refer to themselves as "The Mother of HBCU dancelines."

Demographics

Alcorn State University CDP is a census-designated place (CDP) and the official name for an area covering the Alcorn State University campus, in Claiborne County, Mississippi, United States.

The population at the 2020 census was 1,120. while the Fall 2019 enrollment at Alcorn State University was 3,523.

2020 census

Notable alumni

Sports

References

External links 

 
Public universities and colleges in Mississippi
Historically black universities and colleges in the United States
Land-grant universities and colleges
Educational institutions established in 1871
Universities and colleges accredited by the Southern Association of Colleges and Schools
Education in Claiborne County, Mississippi
Education in Adams County, Mississippi
Education in Warren County, Mississippi
Buildings and structures in Claiborne County, Mississippi
1871 establishments in Mississippi